MNC Vision (legally PT MNC Sky Vision Tbk, formerly Indovision) is an Indonesian subscription-based direct broadcast satellite (DBS) or direct-to-home satellite television and radio service initially in Indonesia. Currently owned by PT MNC Vision Networks Tbk, itself a subsidiary of MNC Asia Holding, MNC Vision is the oldest subscription-based television service in Indonesia.

Its slogan is Pay TV Keluarga Indonesia (Pay TV for Indonesian Families).

History

MNC Vision began operations on 16 January 1994 as Indovision. Indovision started its service with five-channel C-Band Direct Broadcast Satellite (DBS) analog service. Using Palapa C-2 satellite for its transponder and broadcasting system, the C-Band DBS service features programming from international suppliers, such as HBO Asia, Star TV, Discovery, as well as local programming. Following in 1997, IndoStar-1 which also known as Cakrawarta-1 (designed and built by Thomas van der Heyden, founder of what later became Orbital Sciences GEO division), was launched as the world's first commercial communications satellite to use S-band frequencies for broadcast (pioneered by van der Heyden), which provided high-quality transmissions to small-diameter 80 cm antennas in regions that experience heavy rainfall such as Indonesia.

This satellite uses S-Band frequency, which are less vulnerable to atmospheric interference than other satellite frequencies, and are well suited to the tropical climate such as Indonesia. Cakrawarta-1 is managed and operated by PT Media Citra Indostar (MCI), established on 22 July 1991.

By the end of 1997, the company anticipated terminating its analog service and encouraged its subscribers to switch to its digital DBS service.

In 2008, a slimmed-down suite of channels was marketed separately by Indovision as Top TV. It was discontinued at the end of 2017 in the rebranding to MNC Vision.

In May 2009, Indovision launched a satellite named Indostar-2/Cakrawarta-2/ProtoSar-2. It was later renamed to SES-7 in May 2010.

Currently, MNC Vision has 5 channels in high-definition, including HBO HD, Fox Movies Premium HD, National Geographic Channel HD, Disney XD HD, & Fox Sports 3 HD.

On December 12, 2017, Indovision merged with Top TV and another separated service Okevision to form MNC Vision.

MNC News

MNC News was founded in June 2006 as an 24 hours general, infotainment, sports, and lifestyle news channel. MNC News is available on MNC Vision.

Current programming 
 Konspirasi Prabu (Prabu's Conspiration)
 World Headlines
 MNC News Morning
 MNC News Today
 MNC News Now
 MNC News Prime
 MNC News Files
 MNC News Tonight
 MNC News Update
 MNC News Breaking News
 MNC News Special
 Indonesia View (English-language news, replacing all MNC World News programs and MNC Today)
 iTalk (re-run from iNews)
 Talk To iNews (re-run from iNews)
 100% Sport (re-run from GTV)
 iNews Sport (re-run from iNews)
 Sports highlights/news reports coverage:
 2019 Copa América
 Southeast Asian Games (2019 and 2021)
 Summer Olympic Games and Winter Olympic Games (2021 and 2022)
Liga Indonesia Putra
Liga 1
Liga 2
Liga 1 U-20
 Petualangan Panji (Panji's Adventure) (re-run from GTV)
 Mata Angin (Eyes of the Wind) (re-run from GTV)
 Kacamata Petualang (re-run from GTV)  
 Mancing Liar (Wild Fishing) (re-run from GTV)
 Pentas
 Obsesi (Obsession) (re-run from GTV)  
 Goyang Lidah (re-run from RCTI)
 Live Kitchen
 High End on TV
 Roda Mania (re-run from GTV)
 One on One
 Splash News
 M Shop (previously as MNC Shop until 2019)

Current presenters 
 Arlista Hadhi (also a presenter at iNews)
 Aprilia Putri (former MNCTV Jawa Timur bureau anchor, also a presenter at iNews)
 Adjat Wiratma (former Global TV anchor)
 Ariyo Ardi (former SCTV, tvOne, iNews and RCTI anchor, also an editor-in-chief at GTV)
 Aldi Hawari (former TVRI and CNN Indonesia anchor, also a presenter at GTV)
 Fanni Imaniar (former tvOne and CNN Indonesia anchor, also a presenter at GTV and iNews)
 Herjuno Syahputra (former Trans7 anchor, also a presenter at GTV)

 Prabu Revolusi (former Trans TV, MetroTV, RTV and CNN Indonesia anchor)
 Samuel Purba (former GTV anchor)
 Togi Sinaga (former GTV anchor)
 Irma Meida (also a presenter at GTV)
 Shabrina Hashilah (also a presenter at GTV)
 Renie Arumsari (also a presenter at GTV)
 Prisca Papilaya (also a presenter at GTV)
 Anggy Pasaribu (former NET. and BeritaSatu anchor, also a presenter at iNews)
 Stefanie Patricia (also a presenter at iNews)
 Risca Indah (former GTV and iNews anchor)
 Bernadetha Ginting (also a presenter at iNews)
 Ratu Nabilla (former MNCTV, BeritaSatu and CNN Indonesia anchor)
 David Silahooij (former SCTV, Bloomberg TV Indonesia, iNews and MNCTV anchor)
 Ayu Jelita (former MNCTV anchor)
 Kezia Tuju (also a presenter at GTV and IDX Channel)
 Reinhard Sirait (former TVRI Jakarta, TV Edukasi, RTV and CNN Indonesia anchor)

Slogans 
 Satu Visi, Banyak Aksi (One Vision, Many Action, Indovision)
 Top Banget! (Very Top!, Top TV)
 Bioskop Masuk Rumah (Movies goes to home, OkeVision)
 Bukan yang Lain (Nothing else, Indovision/MNC Vision)
 Pay TV Keluarga Indonesia (Pay TV for Indonesian Families)

See also
MNC Sports
OK TV
List of television stations in Indonesia
Television in Indonesia

References

External links
MNC Vision official website 
Channel and transponder list

Indonesian companies established in 1988
Direct broadcast satellite services
Television companies of Indonesia
Companies based in Jakarta
Media Nusantara Citra
Companies listed on the Indonesia Stock Exchange
2012 initial public offerings